Safe Creative is a digital copyright registration service to show evidence of copyright registration for the owners of the creative material in the case of plagiarism or misuse of copyrighted materials.

Main Features of Safe Creative
 Valid registration for any copyright option (copyleft or "all rights reserved").
 Authorship evidence based on: deposit of the work; redundant hash; (MD5, SHA-1, SHA512) from the deposited file; redundant timestamp of the time and hour or registration.
 Open API interface for the recording of authorship claims and queries from external systems.
 Technological framework implemented: Semantic Copyright.
 Automatic RSS channel registration.
 Direct author licensing system.
 Registration at the United States Copyright Office.
 Movies and TV formats registration with collaboration of official Spanish movies and TV producers copyright collecting society EGEDA and Spain National Registrars.

Reception
Plagiarism Today praised the website for having a "rich API" and being "feature rich", but stated that the website could be "confusing and intimidating to use" for those inexperienced with copyrighting.

Sites such as Jamendo, dibujando.net, talentyArt  and VirtualGallery have partnered with Safe Creative to protect the output of their users via copyright.

Authors  of WIPO survey on private registries states that as long as it is possible to testify about the technical characteristics of online registries, there is no reason to doubt about the validity of the generated evidence. Also they consider that one of the main advantages of a private registry based on transparency, such as Safe Creative, when comparing them with public official registries is to make copyright information quickly available to the public and those interested in reaching collaborations and partnerships.

See also 
 Semantic Copyright

References 

Copyright law organizations